Bradfield Highway may refer to:

Bradfield Highway (Sydney) in Sydney, New South Wales
Bradfield Highway (QLD) in Brisbane, Queensland